Freeze-dried ice cream, also known as astronaut ice cream or space ice cream, is ice cream that has had most of the water removed from it by a freeze-drying process, is sealed in a pouch, and requires no refrigeration. Compared to regular ice cream, it can be kept at room temperature without melting, is dry and more brittle and rigid, but still soft when bitten into. It was developed by Whirlpool Corporation under contract to NASA for the Apollo missions.  However, it was never used on any Apollo mission. Freeze-dried foods were developed so that foods could be sent on long-duration spaceflights, as to the Moon, and to reduce the weight of the water and oxygen normally found in food as well as to not melting and spilling liquid in zero-gravity, which would be problematic.

Freeze drying (or lyophilization) removes water from the ice cream by lowering the air pressure to a point where ice sublimates directly from a solid to a gas. The ice cream is first placed in a vacuum chamber and frozen until any remaining water crystallizes. The air pressure is then lowered below water's triple point, creating a partial vacuum, forcing air out of the chamber; next heat is applied, sublimating the ice; finally a freezing coil traps and turn the vaporized water into ice. This process continues for hours, resulting in a freeze-dried ice cream slice.

Freeze-dried ice cream is sold by mail order and is common in science museums and NASA visitor center gift shops, sometimes accompanied by other freeze-dried foods.

Space use
Freeze-dried foods were initially developed for the Mercury missions. Despite use of images of space-walking astronauts in space suits on product packaging, freeze-dried ice cream was not included on any mission in which space suits were used. The only evidence for freeze-dried ice cream ever having flown in space is the menu for the Apollo 7 mission, on which is it listed for one of the meals. However when the only surviving member of Apollo 7 was asked, he did not remember it being served on the flight. 

According to one NASA food scientist, although freeze-dried ice cream was developed on request, "it wasn't that popular." Astronaut Mike Massimino expressed dislike of freeze-dried ice cream, calling it "disgusting" and "more closely related to a building material than a food".

Traditional ice cream in space
During the 1970s, astronauts ate regular ice cream on the Skylab space station and regular ice cream has also been eaten on the International Space Station.
Skylab had a freezer that was used for regular ice cream, and occasionally Space Shuttle and International Space Station astronauts have also taken regular ice cream into the space station.

See also

 Camping food
 List of dried foods
 Space food
 Freeze-drying

References

External links
 History of Space Food - Retrofuture.com

Dried foods
Human spaceflight
Ice cream
NASA spin-off technologies